Bolchi is an Italian surname. Notable people with the surname include:

 Bruno Bolchi (1940–2022), Italian footballer and manager
 Sandro Bolchi (1924–2005), Italian director, actor, and journalist

See also
 Bocchi

Italian-language surnames